Cunt is a vulgarism primarily referring to the female genitalia, see vulva.

Cunt may also refer to:
 Cunt (album), by Australian grindcore band Blood Duster
 Cunt: The Movie, a DVD produced by a group of Melbourne high school students
 Cunt: A Declaration of Independence, a 1998 feminist book by Inga Muscio
 "Gilded Cunt," a song by extreme heavy metal band Cradle of Fifth from the album Nymphetamine
 CuNT, an acronym for a copper nanotube

See also
 Cunt splice, an archaic nautical term for a form of rope splice
 Cunt cap, a type of cap
 Cuntline, an archaic nautical term for the "valley" between the strands of a rope or cable
 The Fucking Cunts Treat Us Like Pricks - 1984 album by Flux of Pink Indians
 See You Next Tuesday (disambiguation), a euphemistic backronym
 Cnut the Great, king of England